Zelotypia is a monotypic moth genus of the family Hepialidae. The only described species is Z. stacyi, the bentwing ghost moth, which is only found in Queensland and New South Wales, Australia. This is a very large species with a wingspan of up to 250 mm. The larva feeds and pupates in the trunks and branches of Eucalyptus.

References

External links

Hepialidae genera

Hepialidae
Monotypic moth genera
Taxa named by John Scott (entomologist)
Exoporia genera
Moths of Australia